Lesne may refer to:

Gérard Lesne (born 1956), French singer
Sylvain Lesné (fl. 2022), neuroscientist

See also
Lesné, village in Slovakia
Leśne (disambiguation), a group of places in Poland